Oktay Derelioğlu (born 17 December 1975) is Turkish former international footballer and current football manager.

Derelioğlu played as a forward and is notable for his goal against Belgium during the qualifying rounds of the 1998 FIFA World Cup. The goal started at midfield before Derelioğlu jinked past six Belgian defenders, one of them twice, mimicking Diego Maradona's "Goal of the Century".

Derelioğlu holds the record for most goals in European competitions for Beşiktaş with 14.

Club career

Early club career (1990–1993) 
Derelioğlu was born in Istanbul and began his club career with local club Fatih Karagümrük. He made his debut at the age of 14, coming on as a substitute in the 66th minute. In two seasons with the club, Derelioğlu netted five times in 20 matches. Trabzonspor transferred him the following season. With Trabzonspor, Derelioğlu didn't find many chances, featuring twice in his first and only season with the club. He scored four times in three matches for the youth team. Beşiktaş transferred him at the start of the 1993–94 season.

Beşiktaş (1993–1998)
Derelioğlu made his debut on 29 August 1993, starting alongside the likes of Feyyaz Uçar, Sergen Yalçın, and Rıza Çalımbay. Derelioğlu scored nine times in 27 matches during his first season. Derelioğlu continued scoring at that rate before breaking out during the 1996–97 season, netting 22 times in the league and four times in cup competitions.

Journeyman years (1999–2008)
Siirtspor transferred him at the start of the 1999–2000 where he scored twice in four matches before being loaned out to Gaziantepspor on 11 November 1999. Derelioğlu spent the rest of the season with the club, scoring 16 times in 20 matches. The following season, Derelioğlu moved abroad to UD Las Palmas for £2 million.

Derelioğlu spent two months with the club before returning to Turkey, making two appearances. Derelioğlu was the subject of controversy with the Spanish club, getting into a physical altercation with then-captain Vinny Samways during a training session. He also complained that his teammates weren't passing the ball to him.

In his first season back with Trabzonspor, Derelioğlu scored 14 times in 13 matches. However, he left the club and signed Fenerbahçe on 25 July 2001, complaining that he hadn't been paid by Trabzonspor. He moved to Samsunspor on the last day of the 2002–03 winter transfer window.

At the end of the season, Derelioğlu moved abroad for a second time, but returned to Turkey during the winter transfer window. With Akçaabat Sebatspor, Derelioğlu netted nine times in 21 matches. Khazar Lankaran transferred him at the start of the 2004–05 season.

Derelioğlu moved back to Turkey during the winter transfer window and made 18 appearances for four different clubs in two-and-a-half seasons. Derelioğlu finished his career with his first club, Fatih Karagümrük, scoring one goal in four matches. He retired before the end of the 2007–08 season.

International career
Derelioğlu started his international career with the Turkey U-16 squad in 1990. He was also capped at U-17, U-18, and U-21 levels, totaling 65 caps and 33 goals at youth level. He earned his first senior call-up in 1995, and scored nine goals in 18 caps from 1995 to 2001.

References

External links
 
 Oktay Derelioğlu at Footballdatabase

1975 births
Living people
Turkish footballers
Turkey international footballers
Turkey under-21 international footballers
Süper Lig players
La Liga players
2. Bundesliga players
Azerbaijan Premier League players
Fatih Karagümrük S.K. footballers
Trabzonspor footballers
Beşiktaş J.K. footballers
Siirtspor footballers
Gaziantepspor footballers
Fenerbahçe S.K. footballers
UD Las Palmas players
Samsunspor footballers
1. FC Nürnberg players
Akçaabat Sebatspor footballers
Khazar Lankaran FK players
Sakaryaspor footballers
Diyarbakırspor footballers
İstanbulspor footballers
Yalovaspor footballers
Turkey youth international footballers
Association football forwards
UEFA Euro 2000 players
Turkish expatriate footballers
Expatriate footballers in Spain
Turkish expatriate sportspeople in Spain
Expatriate footballers in Germany
Turkish expatriate sportspeople in Germany
Expatriate footballers in Azerbaijan
Turkish expatriate sportspeople in Azerbaijan